Jennifer Piot (born 24 March 1992) is a French former alpine ski racer.

She competed at the 2015 World Championships in Beaver Creek, USA, in the Super-G.

References

1992 births
French female alpine skiers
Living people
Alpine skiers at the 2018 Winter Olympics
Olympic alpine skiers of France
Sportspeople from Isère